Varey is a surname. Notable people with the surname include:

David Varey (born 1961), English cricketer
Frank Varey (1908–1988), English motorcycle speedway racer
Matthew Varey (born 1968), Canadian artist and educator

See also
Battle of Varey (1325), Battle in Ain, France